Affectionately Yours is a 1985 Hong Kong film directed by Wong Ying Kit. It stars Eric Tsang, Alan Tam and Maria Chung.

References

Hong Kong comedy films
1985 films
1980s Hong Kong films